Leighton Buzzard is a market town in Bedfordshire, England, in the southwest of the county and close to the Buckinghamshire border. It lies between Aylesbury, Tring, Luton/Dunstable and Milton Keynes, near the Chiltern Hills. 

The built-up area extends on either side of the River Ouzel (here about 2 metres wide) to include its historically separate neighbour Linslade, and is administered by Leighton-Linslade Town Council.

History

Foundation and development

It is unclear when the town was initially founded, although some historians believe that there may have been settlement in the area from as early as 571. There are a number of theories concerning the derivation of the town's name; ‘Leighton’ came from Old English Lēah-tūn, meaning 'farm in a clearing in the woods', and ‘Buzzard’ was added by the Dean of Lincoln, in whose diocese the town lay in the 12th century, from Beau-desert. Another version is that having two communities called ‘Leighton’ and seeking some means of differentiating them the Dean added the name of his local Prebendary or representative to that of the town. At that time it was Theobald de Busar and so over the years the town became known as Leighton Buzzard. The other Leighton became Leighton Bromswold. In the Domesday Book, Leighton Buzzard and Linslade were both called Leestone.

Leighton Buzzard developed into a thriving market town supported by good road, canal and, later, rail links to the agricultural hinterland and London. The town's market charter was granted in 1086 and is still active today. The town's high street is home to numerous historical buildings, more than 70 of which are listed. They include the notable Bank Building on the Market Square (now home to Barclays Bank), designed by the eminent architect Alfred Waterhouse, designer of London's Natural History Museum, London. They also include the Old Town Hall, later used as a fire station and now as a restaurant.

Rothschild family
The town has had a long association with the Rothschild family, since Lionel de Rothschild bought neighbouring farmlands to the west of the town in 1873. In the late 19th century, Baron Ferdinand de Rothschild used the now demolished Leighton House and its stabling, on the High Street, as a hunting box. The family still maintain links with the town through their ownership of Southcourt Stud in Southcote.

Non-conformism
The town has a strong history of dissenters and is home to one of the oldest Friends meeting houses in the region. Established in the 18th century, local Quakers continue to meet in the Meeting House on North Street.

Poor law union
After the Poor Law Amendment Act 1834 Leighton Buzzard became the centre of a poor law union that consisted of 15 surrounding parishes with the union workhouse (still standing) being sited in Grovebury Road.

World War II
During World War II, a secret codebreaking and communications facility, described as "the largest telephone exchange in the world", similar to nearby Bletchley Park, operated from Oxenden House (now demolished) off Plantation Road. The facility employed up to 500 people during the war, although it was shrouded in secrecy.

The Great Train Robbery
The Great Train Robbery took place in 1963 at Bridego Bridge just outside Leighton Buzzard. The robbers were held at the Old Police Station on Wing Road Linslade while waiting to be seen by the local magistrate after being captured a month after the robbery.

Leighton Buzzard station was the location for part of the film Robbery, which is based on the ‘Great Train Robbery’.

Telephone exchange
The first and only TXE1 telephone exchange was developed by the General Post Office and went into service in 1968. To meet the growing demand it was added to by two TXE2 exchanges and a TXE6 exchange on the night of 18 August 1971. A third TXE2 was added later but everything was replaced by a TXE4 exchange around 1977. Some of the TXE2 equipment was used to provide a new TXE2 at West Mersea Island in Essex. The large building, built on the site of the former Lake House, that housed all these TXE exchanges and the current digital exchange can be found in Lake Street.

Expansion
The population of Leighton-Linslade was originally recorded in the 2001 census as 32,417. Part of Billington parish was transferred in 2003 to Leighton-Linslade, and the revised census result including this area was 32,753. At the 2011 census, the population of the Leighton-Linslade built-up area was recorded by the Office for National Statistics as 37,469, and was estimated to have reached 43,203 in 2020.

The town is expanding southwards, with the development of sites in Southern Leighton Buzzard through the Southern Leighton Buzzard Development Brief. It is also expanding eastwards, with several developments forming the Eastern Leighton Linslade Urban Extension Scheme.

Places of interest

The Grand Union Canal runs through the town, alongside the River Ouzel.

All Saints' Church, an Early English parish church dating from 1277. The church is the starting point for the annual Wilkes Walk, described as "a curious procession of the church choir, clergy, and churchwardens across town to the alms houses in North Street." The church was damaged by fire in the 1980s, but has since undergone restoration.

The town has a combined library and theatre (called the Library Theatre) where both live events and film screenings are regularly held.

Rushmere Country Park and Stockgrove Country Park are in nearby Heath and Reach.

Transport

Leighton Buzzard is close to the M1 motorway and A5 road, and is served by Southern and London Northwestern Railway services on the West Coast Main Line railway at Leighton Buzzard railway station (in Linslade). The railway operates non-stop commuting services to Euston railway station, with the fastest peak journey times less than 30 minutes.

The majority of Leighton Buzzard's bus services are operated by Arriva Shires & Essex. Services F70 and F77 provide a direct Bus rapid transit service to  via the Luton to Dunstable Busway, with an onward connection to Luton Airport and also to Milton Keynes. Arriva also operate the 150 service through the town between Aylesbury and Milton Keynes, as well as several local town services. Centrebus, Z&S and Star Travel also operate bus services into Leighton Buzzard which serve local estates and surrounding villages.

Economy
Leighton Buzzard is now home to several UK head offices for national and international firms. Connells Group, the estate agents' chains, have their head offices in the town, as do the UK operations of Tupperware and Grundfos. FTSE 250 company Rightmove had their first ever office in the town, which at the time consisted of just 25 employees. Leighton Buzzard is also home to the Vinci SA Technology Centre, where technology for London's new Crossrail stations was tested. Since 2014, the town has had its own brewery.

The town has a sizeable sand quarrying industry, with good enough quality building sand to export to Egypt. The town is, or has at one time been, the home to various other industries including B/E Aerospace (Aircraft Interiors), Polyformes, Lipton Tea which has now closed down, Gossard clothing, and Lancer Boss (forklifts, etc.).

Governance
Leighton Buzzard is in the civil parish of Leighton-Linslade, in the Central Bedfordshire district. Historically, Leighton Buzzard was a civil parish in its own right: in 1961, its parish had a population of 11,745. On 1 April 1965 the parish was merged with Linslade to form "Leighton Linslade".

Sport

Leighton Buzzard is represented by the sporting teams of Leighton Town F.C. who play football in the Spartan South Midlands Football League. Also at the Bell Close Site are Leighton Buzzard Tennis Club who have been a part of the town since the 1930s. Leighton Buzzard Hockey Club established in 1901, play field hockey and run 4 Men's and 4 Ladies teams of all ability. The Men's teams play in the South Hockey League and the Ladies teams play in the 5 Counties Hockey League. Leighton Buzzard Hockey Club also have junior sides; starting age of 5. Leighton Buzzard R.F.C. play rugby union in South West 1 East and the Ladies rugby team play in NC South East North 2.

Leighton Buzzard Golf Club was established in 1905 and there is also an active running club, Leighton Buzzard Athletics Club. Established in 2011 Leighton Buzzard Road Cycling Club is a cycling club for riders of all abilities. Their race team LBRCC-Solgar compete in local, as well as national, cycling events. Established in 2000, Leighton Linslade Croquet Club, a member of the Croquet Association, have three croquet lawns in Pages Park next to the pavilion.

A greyhound racing track was opened by the Leighton Buzzard Greyhound Racing Association. The track which was located on Bridge Meadows, a flood plain and wharfage between the Grand Union Canal and the River Ouze, south of Bridge Street and is believed to have opened during 1931. The racing was independent (not affiliated to the sports governing body the National Greyhound Racing Club) known as a flapping track, which was the nickname given to independent tracks. The date of closure is not known.

Education

Lower schools
Beaudesert Lower School – Apennine Way
Clipstone Brook Lower School – Brooklands Drive
Greenleas School – Derwent Road
Greenleas School, Sandhills – Kestrel Way
Dovery Down Lower School – Heath Road
Heathwood Lower School – Heath Road
Leedon Lower School – Highfield Road
Linslade Lower School – Leopold Road
Mary Bassett Lower School – Bassett Road
Pulford VA C of E Lower School – Pulford Road
The Rushmere Park Academy – East Street
St Leonard's (Heath & Reach) V A Lower School – Thrift Road
Southcott Lower School – Bideford Green

Middle schools
Brooklands Middle School – a school near the south east edge of the town.
Gilbert Inglefield Academy – next door to Vandyke Upper School.
Leighton Middle School – in the centre of the town, Mary Norton, who wrote 'The Borrowers' books, lived there in her childhood.
Linslade School (Middle) – Situated over the road from Cedars.

Upper schools
Cedars Upper School – Located on the west edge of town, in Linslade, adjoined to Tiddenfoot Leisure Centre. Cedars was once a grammar school.
Vandyke Upper School – Situated on the east edge of town, on Vandyke Road.

Other schools
Oak Bank School – located on Sandy Lane.

Further education
Central Bedfordshire College has a campus near the town centre of Leighton Buzzard.

Twin towns
Leighton Buzzard was twinned with Coulommiers in France in 1958. The twinning was renewed in 1982.
It was also twinned with Titisee-Neustadt in Germany in 1991.

Notable people

Baron Ferdinand de Rothschild (1839–1898) lived in Leighton House in the High Street (demolished in 1959 for the Co-op furniture store, but now the site is occupied by Wilkinson's) before building and moving to Waddesdon Manor. 
Mary Norton (1903–1992), children's writer, famous for The Borrowers series, and the books which became the Disney movie, Bedknobs and Broomsticks, was brought up in The Cedars on the High Street now Leighton Middle School. The building now hosts a blue plaque in commemoration.
Philip O'Connor (1916–1998), poet, was born in the town. 
Louise Dearman (born 1979), who played Glinda in the West End production of Wicked, was brought up in Leighton Buzzard, attending Linslade Middle School and Cedars Upper School. 
The 1980s British new wave band Kajagoogoo were formed in the town.
Triple Olympic gold medallist Charlotte Dujardin was brought up in the town and attended Vandyke Upper School.
Actor Rusty Goffe lives in the town.
Internationally ranked professional snooker player Martin O'Donnell lives in the town with his family.
 The group The Barron Knights were formed in the town.

Nearby places

Climate
Leighton Buzzard experiences an oceanic climate (Köppen climate classification Cfb) similar to almost all of the United Kingdom.

See also
Operation Netwing, a long-running investigation of forced labour and human trafficking in Bedfordshire, by Irish Travellers.

Notes

References
Kevin Quick (2005)     . Leighton-Linslade Past Times. Retrieved 17 May 2005

External links

 Bedfordshire Library Service Leighton Buzzard Timeline

 
Towns in Bedfordshire
Former civil parishes in Bedfordshire
Central Bedfordshire District